The Persuader is the second studio album by Australian recording artist Debbie Byrne. The album was released in 1985 via EMI Music.

Track listing
LP/Cassette

References

Debra Byrne albums
1985 albums
EMI Records albums